is a railway station operated by East Japan Railway Company (JR East), located in the resort town of Yuzawa in Niigata Prefecture, Japan.

Lines
Echigo-Yuzawa Station is serviced by the following lines:

 JR East
 Joetsu Shinkansen
 Joetsu Line
 Hokuetsu Express
 Hokuhoku Line

Station layout
The station has two ground-level island platforms and one side platform for normal trains and two elevated island platforms for the Joetsu Shinkansen. The station building is located above the local platforms and underneath the Shinkansen platforms. The station has a Midori no Madoguchi staffed ticket office. Facilities at the station include souvenir shopping and eating facilities, as well as a sake-themed attraction complete with an indoor onsen bath.

Platforms

History
The station opened on 1 November 1925. With the privatization of Japanese National Railways (JNR) on 1 April 1987, the station came under the control of JR East. The Joetsu Shinkansen opened on 15 November 1982. The Gala-Yuzawa Line to Gala-Yuzawa Station opened on 20 December 1990.

Passenger statistics
In fiscal 2017, the station was used by an average of 3,059 passengers daily (boarding passengers only).

Bus routes
Echigo Kotsu
For Mori-Miyanohara Station

Surrounding area
Yuzawa Town Hall
Yuzawa Post Office

See also
 List of railway stations in Japan

References

External links

 JR East station information 

Railway stations in Niigata Prefecture
Railway stations in Japan opened in 1925
Stations of East Japan Railway Company
Jōetsu Line
Jōetsu Shinkansen
Yuzawa, Niigata